Vedior N.V. was an international staffing services company providing flexible labour, based in Amsterdam, the Netherlands and, thus, contributes more than 60% of its revenue to the social benefits of its employees there. Vedior operates in most of Europe, North and South America, Australia and New Zealand, South Africa, Middle East and Asia. It has been a wholly owned part of Randstad Holding since the end of June 2008.

The company operated in 50 countries and provides professional and executive personnel in IT, accounting, healthcare, engineering, legal, and education. It also provided HR-related services such as vendor management, outplacement, training and business process outsourcing.  Vedior operated under a number of separate brands.

History
Vedior was originally created as a spin-off from the Dutch retail and services company Vendex, following the acquisition of the French company Bis. In 1999 Vedior's application to purchase Select, a UK-based staffing company with operations in the USA and Australia, was approved by the European Commission. Post merger, Vedior became the fourth largest staffing company in the world. Former Select CEO Tony Martin subsequently became the new CEO. Zach Miles replaced Martin as CEO in 2004, and oversaw more than 20 company acquisitions. Tex Gunning joined the company as Miles' replacement in September 2007 having previously been Group Vice President for South East Asia and Australasia at Unilever. Gunning left the firm after its acquisition by Randstad in 2008.

On 3 December 2007, Vedior agreed in principle to be acquired by larger Dutch-listed rival Randstad for around €3.5 billion. The combined company would be second only to Adecco in the global recruitment business.<ref></ref> Randstad launched a formal offer valuing Vedior at €3.3 billion on
2 April 2008, with the takeover targeted to be completed in May.<ref></ref> At the close of the offer period on 13 May, Randstad declared ownership of over 93% of Vedior's shares, facilitating the company's removal from the AEX index.<ref></ref> Vedior's shares were delisted from the Amsterdam Stock Exchange on June 25.<ref></ref>

References

External links
Official website
Randstad NV
Business services companies established in 1998
Companies based in Amsterdam
Employment agencies of the Netherlands
Privately held companies of the Netherlands
Temporary employment agencies